Leopold Partridge (14 July 1901 - 18 June 1976) was a British athlete who competed at the 1924 Summer Olympics.

References

External links
 

1901 births
1976 deaths
People from Potters Bar
Athletes (track and field) at the 1924 Summer Olympics
British hurdlers
Olympic athletes of Great Britain